John Mahon may refer to:

John Mahon (baseball), baseball owner and politician
John Mahon (musician, d-drummer an vocalist
John Mahon (composer) (1749–1839), musician and composer
John Mahon (Australian footballer) (1940–2014), Australian rules footballer
John Mahon (Irish footballer) (born 1999), Irish footballer
John Mahon (politician) (1901–1975), British communist political activist
John Mahon (actor) (1938–2020), American film, stage and television actor
John K. Mahon (1912–2003), historian
John Lincoln Mahon (1865–1933), British socialist activist
John Christopher Mahon (1922–2004), Irish-born priest in Kenya
Sir John Denis Mahon (1910–2011), British scholar

See also
Johnny Mahon (disambiguation)
Jack Mahon (disambiguation)